Pfons was a municipality in the district of Innsbruck-Land in the Austrian state of Tyrol located 13.7 km south of Innsbruck in the Wipptal at the Sill River. Although it is not exactly clear where the name of the village comes from, the location was first mentioned as “Phunzun” in 1030 and later as “Phanes” in 1177. Formerly a part of Matrei am Brenner, Pfons was declared as independent in 1811. On 1 January 2022 Pfons and Mühlbachl were merged into the municipality of Matrei am Brenner.

Population

References

External links

Cities and towns in Innsbruck-Land District